Andesine is a silicate mineral, a member of the plagioclase feldspar solid solution series. Its chemical formula is (Ca, Na)(Al, Si)4O8, where Ca/(Ca + Na) (% anorthite) is between 30 and 50%. The formula may be written as Na0.7-0.5Ca0.3-0.5Al1.3-1.5Si2.7-2.5O8.

The plagioclase feldspars are a continuous solid solution series and as such the accurate identification of individual members requires detailed optical study, chemical analysis or density measurements. Refractive indices and specific gravity increase directly with calcium content.

It is sometimes used as a gemstone.

Name and discovery
Andesine was first described in 1841 for an occurrence in the Marmato mine, Marmato, Cauca, Chocó Department, Colombia. The name is for the Andes due to its abundance in the andesite lavas in those mountains.

In the early 2000s, red and green gemstones began to be marketed under the name of 'andesine'.  After some controversy, these gemstones were subsequently discovered to have been artificially-colored.

Occurrence
Andesine occurs in intermediate igneous rocks such as diorite, syenite, and andesite. It characteristically occurs in metamorphic rocks of granulite to amphibolite facies commonly exhibiting antiperthite texture. It also occurs as detrital grains in sedimentary rocks. It is commonly associated with quartz, potassium feldspar, biotite, hornblende, and magnetite.

References

External links

Tectosilicates
Sodium minerals
Calcium minerals
Feldspar
Triclinic minerals
Gemstones
Minerals in space group 2